The Brazilian administrative region are an administrative division of the Federal District, or of the municipality of Rio de Janeiro.

Federal District 
The Federal District is divided into 31 administrative regions.

Rio de Janeiro 
The municipality of Rio de Janeiro is divided into 33 administrative regions.

See also 
 Administrative regions of the Federal District (Brazil)
 List of Administrative Regions in Rio de Janeiro
 Region (administrative)

References 

.
Subdivisions of Brazil